Monterrey International Airport,, ceremonial name General Mariano Escobedo International Airport, is an international airport located in Apodaca, Nuevo León, Mexico. Together with Del Norte International Airport, the airport handles domestic and international operations for the city of Monterrey and its metropolitan area.

The airport serves as a hub for Aeroméxico, Magnicharters, and VivaAerobús, and a focus city for Volaris. Airport terminals were renovated and expanded in 2003 and 2007.

There are almost 300 daily flights to more than 35 destinations in Mexico, the United States, and Latin America. With the second highest traffic in northern Mexico, Monterrey International Airport is also Mexico's fifth and Latin America's 12th-busiest airport. It had one of the fastest influx growth in recent years; it handled 8,269,834 passengers in 2021, and 10,943,186 passengers in 2022.

History
In September 2005, an Aeroméxico Boeing 767 took off from Monterrey on a flight to Madrid, marking the launch of the first nonstop link to Europe. The airline later introduced a route to Rome, but in 2009 financial difficulties forced it to end the flight. Service to Madrid concluded the same year, leaving Monterrey without transatlantic flights.

In September 2014, Monterrey commenced its first intercontinental flight in years when Aeromexico began flying its Boeing 787 Dreamliner four days a week to Tokyo-Narita as a fuel stop to flights between Mexico City International Airport and Tokyo-Narita. Aeromexico stated that the flight would last while Tijuana International Airport, the usual stop between the Aeromexico flight to Tokyo, made improvements to its runway. Monterrey was selected due to its importance to the country's economy and being a popular business destination. Later, Aeromexico's flight from Mexico City to Tokyo-Narita was upgraded to a direct flight, with once-daily flights leaving from Mexico City, so the Tokyo flights from Monterrey have been discontinued.

The airport regained direct connectivity with Europe in December 2021 when Aeroméxico reinstated the route to Madrid.

Terminal configurations

Terminal A
Terminal A consists of check-in facilities, baggage claiming, shopping areas, restaurants, customs, airport and airline offices, and many other services, while the satellite building connected via tunnels comprises all the VIP and waiting lounges, migration among other services as well as obviously the boarding gates. The Satellite building, is divided into two concourses, North Concourse for domestic flights (Gates A1-A15), while South Concourse comprises all the international flights that operate into the airport (Gates B3-B8). Several flights are delayed day by day due to the lack of free contact and even remote positions, as the ones capable of handling large aircraft such as the Boeing 787. Nevertheless, Terminal C and Terminal B work as a relief system for this terminal. There are future plans to remodel and expand the Satellite building, adding at least four new jetways and three remote positions.

Terminal B
Terminal B is considered as the second-most modern air facility in the country (only behind Mexico City's Terminal 2). It was opened in September 2010 and comprises eight gates, six of which are equipped with jetways and two apron-doors that might be used by Aeroméxico's feeder airline Aeroméxico Connect. The terminal houses all operations of the SkyTeam member airlines, similar to Terminal 2 in Mexico City International Airport. The airport terminal is able to handle up to 2 million passengers per year, and allows the airport to free some slots for new airlines to operate into Terminal A.

Terminal C
Terminal C, inaugurated on November 30, 2006, houses the operations from low-cost carrier serving the airport, VivaAerobús. This terminal works independent of Terminal A.

Air Cargo Terminal
"Air Cargo Terminal' was recently launched and has  for operations. Courier companies operating nationally and abroad, notably FedEx, DHL, UPS, and Estafeta.

Grupo Aeroportuario Centro Norte
Grupo Aeroportuario Centro Norte, the airport company operating this airport, has its headquarters in the air cargo zone.

Facilities
The airport resides at an elevation of 1280 feet (390 m) above mean sea level. It has one runway designated 11/29 with an asphalt surface measuring 3,000 by 45 metres (9,843 ft × 148 ft). A second runway which is rarely used is designated 16/34 and also has an asphalt surface with a stretch of 1,801 by 30 metres (5,909 ft × 98 ft). The main runway, 11/29, has an ILS approach system and has its own VHF omnidirectional radio range (VOR) and DME station. It is also capable of handling aircraft such as the Boeing 747-400, but due to the lack of remote positions, this airport is mainly used by smaller aircraft.

Due to the growing Korean population in Monterrey, Aeroméxico also operated a direct flight from Monterrey to Seoul Incheon airport. This was the airport's first intercontinental flight since the discontinuation of the Tokyo-Narita route operating through Monterrey. The flights to Seoul were also discontinued.

 Terminal A: 9 contact positions, 12 remote positions
 Terminal B: 6 contact positions, 7 remote positions
 Terminal C: 8 remote positions
VivaAerobús has its corporate headquarters in the Cargo Zone of Terminal C
 Number of jetways: 9 (Terminal A), 6 (Terminal B)
 Number of baggage claiming carousels: 4

Airlines and destinations

Passenger

Cargo

Destinations map

Statistics

Passengers

Busiest routes

Ground transportation 

Besides the authorized taxis, private bus lines provide continuous transportation services to nearby cities such as Saltillo as well as linking to other modes of transportation such as local bus stations. A public transportation bus line operated by the Nuevo Leon State Government called the Ruta Express (Express Route) operates from the airport to the Line 1 "Y-Griega" Metro Station.

Accidents and incidents
 On February 11, 2010, MexicanaClick de Aviación Flight 7222, operated by Fokker 100 XA-SHJ suffered an undercarriage malfunction on approach to Quetzalcóatl International Airport, Nuevo Laredo. A low fly-past confirmed that both main gears had not deployed. The aircraft diverted to Monterrey. It was substantially damaged in the landing, having departed the runway and spun through 180°.
 On April 13, 2010, an Aerounion – Aerotransporte de Carga Union Airbus A-300B4-200, registration XA-TUE performing a freight flight, AeroUnion Flight 302 from Mexico (Mexico) to Monterrey (Mexico) with 5 crew, crashed on approach to land on General Mariano Escobedo International Airport's runway 11. The aircraft came to rest on a highway at around 23:30L (04:30Z Apr 14). All on board perished, 1 person in a truck on the highway was also reported killed, the airplane was destroyed after a large fire broke out.
 On November 24, 2010, a Mexican Air Force AN-32 cargo flight crashed when taking off from General Mariano Escobedo International Airport for a flight to Mexico City. All 5 crew members died.
 On December 9, 2012, a Learjet 25 carrying Mexican-American singer Jenni Rivera and 4 other passengers, and 2 crew, crashed 7 minutes after take-off, while on its way to Toluca. All seven occupants died.
 On Thursday, March 18, 2021, VivaAerobús flight 4343 from Puerto Vallarta, Mexico, performed by an Airbus A320 jet, suffered a nose gear collapse after landing. The jet was substantially damaged, but there were no injuries among the 127 crew and passengers on board.

See also
 List of the busiest airports in Mexico

References

External links
 Monterrey International Airport location
 Grupo Aeroportuario Centro Norte

Transportation in Monterrey
Airports in Nuevo León